Ahmad Sultan, is a Lebanese singer, musician, and songwriter. whose diverse vocal ability and style has attracted a following from different countries in the Arab world. Sultan started his music career at a young age; in 2017 he released his first single Khent El Alb.

Discography

Singles
 Khent El Ab (2017)  
 Tofle (2016)

Videography

References

External links 
 

21st-century Lebanese male singers
Living people
People from Tripoli, Lebanon
Year of birth missing (living people)